Umedzhon Sharipov (born on 4 October 1992) is a Tajikistani footballer who plays for FC Khatlon, and the Tajikistan national football team.

Career

Club
Sharipov was released by FC Istiklol at the end of the 2015 season.

In January 2017, Sharipov signed a one-year contract with Uzbek League side FK Mash'al Mubarek. On 1 July 2017, Sharipov left Mash'al Mubarek.

On 31 March 2020, Sharipov was listed in FC Khatlon's squad for the 2020 Tajikistan Higher League season.

Career statistics

Club

International

Statistics accurate as of match played 13 June 2017

International goals
Scores and results list Tajikistan's goal tally first.

Honors
Istiklol
 Tajik League (2): 2014, 2015
 Tajik Cup (2): 2013, 2014
 Tajik Supercup (1): 2015

References

External links
 

1992 births
Living people
Tajikistani footballers
Tajikistan international footballers
FC Istiklol players
Footballers at the 2014 Asian Games
Association football midfielders
Asian Games competitors for Tajikistan